Jordan Lee Bove (born 12 November 1995) is an English footballer who played in the Football League for Oldham Athletic.

Career

Oldham Athletic
Bove was born in Manchester and was on the books of Manchester City before he joined Oldham Athletic. He made his professional debut as an 85th-minute substitute in a 5–1 win over Notts County on 12 November 2013 in the Football League Trophy although he was sent-off just two minutes later.

After his performances in the youth team, Bove was awarded with his first professional contract on 20 June 2014, signing a one-year contract with the option of a second.

On 1 July 2016 he was released by Oldham Athletic after three years in the first team.

Whilst at Oldham he had loan spells at Hyde, Colwyn Bay, Ashton United, Ramsbottom United and Droylsden,

Non-league career
He then joined Curzon Ashton before moving in August 2016 to Mossley  He scored four goals in 26 appearances for the club before moving to 1874 Northwich in March 2017 and Stockport Town. He then returned to Mossley making an additional two appearances before again departing the club, joining Maine Road and then playing for Congleton Town in August and September 2017.

In January 2018 he moved to Radcliffe Borough before moving in August to Glossop North End. In October 2020 he returned for a second spell at 1874 Northwich later signing on dual registration terms with Cheshire Football League side Denton Town, when the team narrowly missed winning the Division One title on the final day of the season in April 2021 in a match when Bove was sent off. In 2021 he played two games for Dom Doyle FC in the Tameside Football League.

Career statistics

References

External links

1995 births
Living people
English footballers
Association football forwards
Oldham Athletic A.F.C. players
Hyde United F.C. players
Colwyn Bay F.C. players
Ashton United F.C. players
Ramsbottom United F.C. players
English Football League players
National League (English football) players
Mossley A.F.C. players
Droylsden F.C. players
Radcliffe F.C. players
Glossop North End A.F.C. players
1874 Northwich F.C. players
Northern Premier League players
Maine Road F.C. players
Stockport Town F.C. players
North West Counties Football League players
Congleton Town F.C. players